Under the Never Sky is a 2012 young adult debut novel by Veronica Rossi and is the first in a trilogy. The book follows two teens, a girl that has always lived within a protected city and a boy who is both a Night Seer and a Scire, as they attempt to survive. Film rights to the trilogy have been optioned by Warner Brothers Studios, with the novel being sold in more than 25 international markets. Book 2 of the trilogy, Through the Ever Night, was released in the United States on January 8, 2013 and became both a New York Times and a USA Today Best Seller before the month was over. The final installment, Into the Still Blue, was released January 28, 2014 however the final novel did not receive as much praise as the preceding books.

Plot summary 
Under the Never Sky follows the character of Aria, a 17-year-old girl who has been exiled from Reverie, the domed city in a dystopian future 300 years after a major catastrophe has decimated the Earth. Aria was banished from her home when she is blamed for starting a fire that took the lives of her best friend and two others. This punishment means almost certain death: outside of her Pod and other similar Pods where the technologically advanced dwell, is a wasteland known as the Death Shop. It's a place known to be filled with cannibals and terrible Aether storms; even the air can kill you. However, she soon discovers that she can breathe the outside air without fatal harm, though she has little other means of surviving in the savage land. Then she meets an Outsider named Perry, Aria eventually realizes that he is her only chance for survival. Despite his reluctance to help a sheltered girl from Reverie, Perry knows that Aria has the potential to help him redeem himself. The two must learn how to work together if they are to survive in this new dangerous world.

Characters 
 Aria - seventeen-year-old "dweller" who is banished from her home and sent out into the outside world.
 Peregrine "Perry" - an eighteen-year-old boy who lives in one of the tribes that inhabit the outside world. .
 Roar - also a member of Perry's tribe as well as his best friend. Was in a relationship with Olivia before she left.
 Olivia "Liv" - Perry's sister, is in a relationship with Roar before she is married off to the leader of another tribe in return for food.

Sequels
"Through The Ever Night" is the sequel to this book and the second installment in the series.

"Into The Still Blue" is the third installment of the series.

Spin-offs 
Rossi has also written two other Under the Never Sky stories, Roar and Liv and Brooke, both focused on the respective characters mentioned in their titles and further developing those characters.

Reception
Critical reception for Under the Never Sky has been positive. Common elements of the novel that received praise were the novel's "hopeful ending" and "smooth prose".

Adaptations 
Rossi posted in March 2016 to her facebook fan page that a "terrific production company" has the rights to a film adaptation of the book and is working on a script.

References

External links 

 Official author site

2012 American novels
2012 debut novels
American young adult novels